Author Services Inc. (ASI) represents the literary, theatrical and musical works of the late Scientology founder L. Ron Hubbard. It is a wholly owned subsidiary of the Church of Spiritual Technology.

ASI was incorporated as a for-profit company in the state of California on October 13, 1981, and is located in Los Angeles. ASI pays a substantial portion of its income to the Church of Spiritual Technology, a non-profit corporation also based in California.

Since its incorporation ASI manages L. Ron Hubbard's personal, business and literary affairs. After Hubbard's death in 1986, ASI continued to represent his literary and musical works worldwide. Nineteen of his books have been on The New York Times best sellers list, and his works have been translated into 72 languages.

ASI administers and holds the Writers and Illustrators of the Future contest. The contest had been established and sponsored by Hubbard in 1983 and since was supported by Science-Fiction writers such as Robert Silverberg, Kevin J. Anderson, Larry Niven, Frederik Pohl, Gene Wolfe, Orson Scott Card and others.

ASI also sells book cover prints and special editions. In 2005 ASI received a verification certificate from Guinness World Records on behalf of L. Ron Hubbard for being the "most translated author" in the world (since surpassed by Paulo Coehlo).

While ASI presents Hubbard's fiction and secular works under the Galaxy Press label, his Scientology-related writings are represented by Bridge Publications (New Era Publications outside North America).

The 200-seat Author Services (ASI) Theater reopened in October 2008 after a three-year hiatus to resume its live presentations of L. Ron Hubbard's original series of pulp fiction classic tales penned during the 1930s and 1940s and recently adapted into multi-cast audio performances.

See also
 Writers of the Future
 Space Jazz

Notes

Additional sources
 Hubbard Hot Author Status Called Illusion (Mike McIntyre, San Diego Union April 15, 1990, p1)

External links
 Official web site
 Information on ASI connection to the CST (Sc-I-R-S-Ology)
 News Site of ASI showing their worldwide activities
 Strange Vibrations David Langford about ASI's activities during Conspiracy '87, the 1987 Worldcon.

L. Ron Hubbard
Scientology organizations